Wilmoth was an unincorporated community in Barbour County, West Virginia, United States.

The community most likely was named after the local Wilmoth family.

References 

Unincorporated communities in West Virginia
Unincorporated communities in Barbour County, West Virginia